Desmond "Des" Ronald Thomson (born 22 August 1942) is a former racing cyclist from New Zealand.

He won the silver medal in the men's road race at the 1966 British Empire and Commonwealth Games.

He went to two Olympics in 1964 and 1968 competing in the men's road race and team time trial. In the men's road race, he finished 61st in 1964 and 52nd in 1968.

His brother Richie Thomson was also a New Zealand representative cyclist competing at two Commonwealth Games and the 1968 Olympic Games.

Des Thomson also won the Australian Road title. He rode for Queensland having moved to the Gold Coast and joining Nerang – Gold Coast cycling club.

References

1942 births
Living people
New Zealand male cyclists
Commonwealth Games silver medallists for New Zealand
Cyclists at the 1966 British Empire and Commonwealth Games
Cyclists at the 1964 Summer Olympics
Cyclists at the 1968 Summer Olympics
Olympic cyclists of New Zealand
Sportspeople from Oamaru
Commonwealth Games medallists in cycling
Medallists at the 1966 British Empire and Commonwealth Games